The Highline Trail is a scenic hiking trail in Glacier National Park, Montana, United States. The trail stretches  from Logan Pass to Granite Park Chalet, and continues another  from there to Fifty Mountain Campground.  The trail follows the Garden Wall ridge and the continental divide for most of its length.  The trail offers scenic views of glaciated U-shaped valleys.  A  round trip side trail takes hikers up the side of the Garden Wall to an overlook to Grinnell Glacier.

References
 
 

Protected areas of Flathead County, Montana
Glacier National Park (U.S.)
Hiking trails in Montana
Going-to-the-Sun Road